Adi Gevins is a San Francisco Bay Area-based radio documentarian, producer, educator, archivist, and creative consultant who has been referred to as the "fairy godmother of community radio".

Radio career
Gevins has won an Ohio State Award, an American Bar Association Silver Gavel, multiple Golden Reels from the National Federation of Community Broadcasters, and two George Foster Peabody Awards, one with Laurie Garrett for Science Story in 1978, and one with SoundVision for The DNA Files in 2000.

Much of Gevins' work has been done for the Pacifica Radio station KPFA in Berkeley, California, including "One Billion Seconds Later", which won the Ohio State Award and "Me and My Shadow", a documentary about Cointelpro's infiltration of the New Left. Gevins served as executive producer for the celebrated public radio documentary series, "The Bill of Rights Radio Education Project", produced for KPFA - Pacifica Radio.

Gevins holds a master's degree in library and information studies from the University of California at Berkeley.

In 2021, Gevins received the Society of Professional Journalists' Norcal 2020 Excellence in Journalism Unsung Hero Award for her work as protector of the KPFA archives; as well as, her broader archival efforts assists organizations around the country in archiving their own broadcasts.

References

American radio journalists
Pacifica Foundation people
Peabody Award winners
Living people
People from the San Francisco Bay Area
Year of birth missing (living people)
American women radio journalists
University of California, Berkeley alumni
21st-century American women